Rodney Dwayne Bailey (born October 7, 1979) is a former American football defensive end who most recently played for the Arizona Cardinals of the National Football League (NFL). He is a graduate of Ohio State University and completed his degree in only 3.5 years.

Early years
A native of Cleveland, Ohio, Bailey attended St. Edward High School in nearby Lakewood, Ohio and was a letterman in football. He trucked Marty Mordarski in a memorable game against Padua. In football, he was named the Cleveland Division I Player of the Year by The Plain Dealer, and was a first-team Division I Associated All-State pick. In addition, he was named the Cleveland Touchdown Club player of the year and was named to numerous high school All-American teams.  He graduated from St. Edward in 1997.

College career
Entering Ohio State, Bailey was listed as one of the top 40 high school recruits in United States. Bailey started as a true freshman and started 34 games in total. His senior year, Bailey was named a co-captain, named an all-Big Ten selection and was honored as team defensive player of the year.

Professional career

2001
• Drafted in the 6th round by the Pittsburgh Steelers.
• Played all 16 games with one start.
• Recorded 12 tackles (11 solo) and 2 sacks.

2002
• Played all 16 games and 2 postseason games for the Pittsburgh Steelers.
• Recorded 18 tackles (15 solo), 5.5 sacks, and a fumble recovery.

2003
• Played all 16 games for the Pittsburgh Steelers.
• Recorded 9 tackles (6 solo) and 2 sacks.

2004
• Signed to the New England Patriots.
• Spent season on injured reserve.
• Earned a championship ring as a member of the winning team for Super Bowl XXXVIII.

2005
• Signed September 14 to the Seattle Seahawks and played 8 games.
• Recorded 13 tackles (8 solos) and 2 forced fumbles.

2006
• Played in 12 games for the Pittsburgh Steelers.
• Played in 50th game as a member of the Steelers.

2007
• Signed with the Arizona Cardinals.
• Listed on depth chart as defensive tackle, a change from his usual position of defensive end.

After football
In 2009, St. Edward announced that Bailey would be inducted into the school's Athletic Hall of Fame.

References

1979 births
Living people
American football defensive ends
American football defensive tackles
Arizona Cardinals players
New England Patriots players
Players of American football from Cleveland
St. Edward High School (Lakewood, Ohio) alumni
Pittsburgh Steelers players
Seattle Seahawks players
Ohio State Buckeyes football players